The Oxshott Pottery was set up by Denise Wren and Henry Wren at their home, Potters Croft, in Oxshott, Surrey in 1920. The pottery had a reputation as a successful studio pottery, producing brightly glazed earthenware pottery; examples of their work can be found in the Victoria and Albert Museum, the Crafts Study Centre, Farnham, Surrey, and Kingston Museum Art Gallery.

Publications
 Wren, Henry & Denise (1928) Handcraft Pottery for workshop and school. Sir Isaac Pitman & Sons
 Wren, Henry & Denise (1932) Pottery: The Finger-built methods. Sir Isaac Pitman & Sons
 Wren, Denise & Rosemary (1952) Pottery Making: Making Pots and Building and Firing Small Kilns. London : Pitman

References

English pottery
Borough of Elmbridge